Alan Docking Racing (ADR) is a motor racing team based in Silverstone, United Kingdom. The team was formed in 1975 by Australian Alan Docking.

The team competed in the British Formula 3 series throughout most of its existence; however, it has also graduated to A1 Grand Prix and Superleague Formula and has also competed in sports and saloon cars at a national and international level. The team ran also as Alan Docking Racing Finland. Currently, the team runs in the FIA World Endurance Championship as Delta-ADR, in a joint venture with engineering company Delta Motorsport (with one car branded as G-Drive Racing).

History
With team creation, ADR ran in British F3 winning in a row the 1976 and 1977 championships with Rupert Keegan and Stephen South. In 1978, it compete in the European Formula Two Championship with drivers including Stefan Johansson.

ADR join the British Formula Ford Championship in 1987 and 1988 with Mazda. Returned in British F3 since 1989, the team has raced with notable drivers including Mika Salo, Hideki Noda, Ricardo Rosset, Mark Webber and Marcos Ambrose.

In 2002 ADR won their third British F3 title with Robbie Kerr.

In 2005–06, ADR collaborate with A1 Team Australia in the new A1 Grand Prix championship.

Complete European Formula Two results
(key) (Results in bold indicate pole position; results in italics indicate fastest lap.)

Series results

 D.C. = Drivers' Championship position, T.C. = Teams' Championship position.

References

External links
 

Auto racing teams established in 1975
1975 establishments in Australia
A1 Grand Prix racing teams
24 Hours of Le Mans teams
British Formula Three teams
FIA World Endurance Championship teams
Superleague Formula teams

British Touring Car Championship teams
British auto racing teams